Archery competitions at the 2019 Military World Games were held in Wuhan, China from 20 to 24 October 2019.

Medal summary

Medalists

Recurve

Para Recurve (demonstration)

Medal standings

Demonstration medal standings
The medals in demonstration sport: Para Archery were awarded to these countries. However, they were not included in the official medal standings.

References

External links
Results book

Military World Games
2019 in Chinese sport
Archery
2019